HMS Thunderer was a two-deck 84-gun second rate ship of the line, a modified version of the Canopus/Formidable-class launched on 22 September 1831 at Woolwich Dockyard.

She was hulked in 1863 as a target ship at Portsmouth. Thunderer was renamed twice in quick succession: first in 1869 to Comet after (C / 1868 L1 Winnecke), and again in 1870 to Nettle. HMS Nettle was sold in December 1901 to Messrs. King & co, of Garston, to be broken up.

Notes

References

Mid-Victorian RN vessel HMS Thunderer. Retrieved 20 November 2007.
Lavery, Brian (2003) The Ship of the Line - Volume 1: The development of the battlefleet 1650–1850. Conway Maritime Press. .

External links
 

Ships of the line of the Royal Navy
Canopus-class ships of the line
Ships built in Woolwich
1831 ships